An Election to the Edinburgh Corporation was held on 2 May 1967, alongside municipal elections across Scotland. Of the councils 69 seats, 24 were up for election; two in Liberton and St. Andrew's wards, and one in every other ward.

After the election Edinburgh Corporation was composed of 37 Progressives, 29 Labour councillors, 2 Conservatives, and 1 Liberal. The Progressives increased their majority to three seats.

Aggregate results

Ward Results

References

1967
1967 Scottish local elections